Boston City Council elections were held on November 6, 2001. Nine seats (five representatives and four at-large members) were contested in the general election, as the incumbents for districts 1, 5, 8, and 9 ran unopposed. Two seats (districts 3 and 6) had also been contested in the preliminary election held on September 25, 2001.

At-large
Councillors Francis Roache, Stephen J. Murphy, and Michael F. Flaherty were re-elected. Councillor Peggy Davis-Mullen did not seek re-election, as she ran for Mayor of Boston, losing in the mayoral election to incumbent Thomas Menino. Davis-Mullen's at-large seat was won by Maura Hennigan, who had been the District 6 councillor since 1984, and a member of the council since 1982.

 Francis Roache resigned his council seat after being elected Registrar of Deeds for Suffolk County in November 2002; Felix D. Arroyo joined the council in January 2003 to serve the remainder of Roache's term.

District 1
Councillor Paul Scapicchio ran unopposed and was re-elected.

District 2
Councillor James M. Kelly was re-elected.

District 3
Councillor Maureen Feeney was re-elected.

District 4
Councillor Charles Yancey was re-elected.

District 5

General election
Councillor Daniel F. Conley ran unopposed and was re-elected.

Special election
In February 2002, Conley was named interim district attorney for Suffolk County; he resigned his council seat shortly thereafter. The vacancy was filled by a special election, which took place on June 4, 2002, with the preliminary election on May 7, 2002. Robert Consalvo was elected to serve the remainder of Conley's term.

District 6
Councillor Maura Hennigan ran for (and won) an at-large seat on the council; her district seat was won by John M. Tobin Jr.

District 7
Councillor Chuck Turner was re-elected.

District 8
Councillor Michael P. Ross ran unopposed and was re-elected.

District 9

General election
Councillor Brian Honan ran unopposed and was re-elected.

Special election
Honan died in July 2002, creating a vacancy that was filled by a special election, which took place on December 10, 2002, with the preliminary election on November 12, 2002. Jerry P. McDermott was elected to serve the remainder of Honan's term.

See also
 List of members of Boston City Council
 Boston mayoral election, 2001

References

Further reading
 

City Council election
Boston City Council elections
Boston City Council election
Boston City Council